Courage is a 2021 German documentary film written and directed by Aliaksei Paluyan. It follows an underground theatre group during the 2020–2021 Belarusian protests.

Accolades 
Courage won The Cinema for Peace Award for The Political Film of the Year in 2022.

References

External links
 
 
 

2021 films
2021 documentary films
German documentary films
Documentary films about Belarus